is a passenger railway station located in the town of Kami, Mikata District, Hyōgo, Japan, operated by West Japan Railway Company (JR West).

Lines

Station layout
The station consists of one ground-level island platform connected to the station building by a footbridge. The station is unattended.

Platforms

Adjacent stations

History
Satsu Station opened on October 25, 1911.

Passenger statistics
In fiscal 2016, the station was used by an average of 118 passengers daily

Surrounding area
 Satsu Post Office
 Satsu onsen

See also
List of railway stations in Japan

References

External links

 Station Official Site

Railway stations in Hyōgo Prefecture
Sanin Main Line
Railway stations in Japan opened in 1911
Kami, Hyōgo (Mikata)